Tong Lei (born 16 December 1997 in Quzhou) is a Chinese football player who currently plays for Chinese Super League club Dalian Professional.

Club career
Tong Lei started his professional football career in 2016 when he was promoted to Hangzhou Greentown's first squad. On 15 May 2016, he made his debut for Hangzhou in the 2016 Chinese Super League against Liaoning Whowin, coming on as a substitute for Cheng Mouyi in the 74th minute. Despite the club facing relegation at the end of the season, Tong was given the opportunity to gain more playing time and he would gradually start to establish himself as a regular with the squad and was part of the team that narrowly missed out on promotion at the end of the 2019 China League One season.  

On 7 February 2020 Tong Lei joined top tier club Dalian Pro along with Wu Wei and Xue Qinghao on the same day. He would make his debut in a league game against Shandong Taishan F.C. on 26 July 2020 in a 3-2 defeat.

Career statistics
Statistics accurate as of match played 31 January 2023.

References

External links
 

1997 births
Living people
People from Quzhou
Chinese footballers
Footballers from Zhejiang
Zhejiang Professional F.C. players
Dalian Professional F.C. players
China League One players
Chinese Super League players
Association football defenders